The pathetic dot theory or the New Chicago School theory was introduced by Lawrence Lessig in a 1998 article and popularized in his 1999 book, Code and Other Laws of Cyberspace. It is a socioeconomic theory of regulation. It discusses how lives of individuals (the pathetic dots in question) are regulated by four forces: the law, social norms, the market, and architecture (technical infrastructure).

Theory
Lessig identifies four forces that constrain our actions: the law, social norms, the market, and architecture. The law threatens sanction if it is not obeyed. Social norms are enforced by the community. Markets through supply and demand set a price on various items or behaviors. The final force is the (social) architecture. By that Lessig means "features of the world, whether made, or found"; noting that facts like biology, geography, technology and others constrain our actions. Together, those four forces are the totality of what constrains our action, in fashion both direct and indirect, ex post and ex ante.

The theory has been formally called by Lessig in 1998 "The New Chicago School", and can be seen as a theory of regulation.

The theory can be applied to many aspects of life (such as how smoking is regulated), but it has been popularized by Lessig's subsequent usage of it in the context of the regulation of the Internet. Lessig noted that the key difference in regulation of the Internet (cyberspace), compared to regulation of the "real world" ("realspace"), is the fact that the architecture of the internet – the computer code that underlies all software – is created by humans, whereas in the real world much of the architecture, based on laws of physics, biology, and major social and cultural forces, is beyond our control. Lessig sees code as an important force that should be of interest to the wider public, and not only to the programmers. He notes the importance of how technology-mediated architecture, such as coded software, can affect and regulate our behavior. Lessig wrote:

See also
Chicago school of economics

References

Further reading
Lessig, Lawrence, Code 2.0, Chapter: What Things Regulate

Social theories
Regulation
Internet governance